General elections were held in Costa Rica on 3 February 1974. Daniel Oduber Quirós of the National Liberation Party won the presidential election, whilst his party also won the parliamentary election. Voter turnout was 79.9%.

The Left was theoretically outlawed as the Constitution didn't allow the existence of Marxist parties, but the prohibition was not endorsed in practice by that time and even was lifted with a Constitutional reform for the next election.

Campaign
The government was affected in its popularity by the “Vesco Case” a corruption case involving then president José Figueres and his dubious connections with international criminal Robert Vesco, which caused heat for ruling party's candidate Daniel Oduber. Rodrigo Carazo, a former member of PLN and Congressman run as an independent candidate. Carazo had problems with Figueres when they both face each other in a primary election previously. Carazo promised to expel Vesco if he won, he also received the endorsement of former president José Trejos.

Another heated issue was Communism in general, as the election was in the middle of the Cold War. Topics like the diplomatic relationships with the USSR (which candidate Jorge González Martén swear will end in his government). The Catholic Church made a public statement criticizing both Communism and savage Capitalism and calling for a third option. Both PLN (Social Democrats) and the Christian Democratic Party claim to be that option. The traditional Left represented by Manuel Mora’s Socialist Action Party defended itself arguing that a previous archbishop Victor Manuel Sanabria expressed that Costa Rican Catholics had no quarrel in being members of the Communist Party. The far-right Free Costa Rica Movement also made a very expensive campaign against Mora's party on the media at the time.

Another notorious candidate was Gerardo Wenceslao Villalobos, aka GW, a very eccentric candidate nominated by the Democratic Party. Villalobos did a lot of crazy stunts and unusual activities for a candidate, like boxing and wrestling matches or trying to jump in parachute.

Results

President

By province

Parliament

By province

Local governments

Ballot

References

1974 elections in Central America
1974 in Costa Rica
Elections in Costa Rica